Khalilan or Khalilyan may refer to:
Khalilan, Gilan
Khalilan, South Khorasan
Khalilan-e Olya (disambiguation)
Khalilan-e Sofla (disambiguation)